Cynaeda furiosa is a moth in the family Crambidae. It was described by George Hampson in 1900. It is found in Central Asia and Iran.

Subspecies
Cynaeda furiosa furiosa
Cynaeda furiosa amseli Lattin, 1959 (Iran)

References

Moths described in 1900
Odontiini